This is a list of pages with repertoire for string instruments.

Solo instruments
Violin:
Violin solo
Violin sonatas
Violin concertos
Violin duo
Viola:
Viola solo
Viola and piano 
Viola concertos
Cello:
Cello solo
Cello and piano
Cello ensemble pieces
Cello concertos
Double bass:
Double bass solo
Double bass and piano
Double bass concertos
Guitar:
Guitar solo
Guitar duo
Guitar concertos
Harp:
Harp solo
Harp concertos
Harpsichord:
Harpsichord solo
Harpsichord concertos
Piano:
Piano solo
Piano left-hand
Piano duo
Piano concertos
Multiple solo instruments:
Double concerto for violin and cello
Triple concerto for violin cello and piano

Chamber music
Strings duos
String trios
String quartet
String quintet
String sextet
String octet
String decet
Piano trio
Piano quartet
Piano quintet
Piano sextet

External links
 String Instrument Katalog by Henle
 Concertos and other works and chronology in large index
 A reference source on the composers of the 18th century

Classical music lists
Lists of compositions by instrumentation
String instruments